Peter Fraize is a saxophonist and George Washington University professor best known for his freestyle jazz and for performing as a part of the Peter Fraize Quintet.

Biography 
Raised in northern Virginia, Fraize attended the New England Conservatory of Music in Boston where he studied classical saxophone.  He later studied at the Royal Conservatory of The Hague under Dutch saxophonist Leo van Oostrom.  While there Fraize worked with Scapes, a quintet which won first prize at the 1989 Middelzee Jazz Concours.

On returning to the United States in 1989, Fraize formed the fusion group Stickman, which performed at the Mellon Jazz Festival in Pittsburgh.  He is a member of the Greg Hatza Organization and is also in a rock group, The Emptys. His jazz group, The Peter Fraize Quartet, won the 1999 Wammie award (Washington Area Music Association) for Contemporary Jazz Ensembles.

Fraize is the director of jazz studies at George Washington University.

Discography

As leader or co-leader
 Organic Matter (Union, 2009)
 Third Attention (Union, 1998)
 You St.: Live at State of the Union (Union, 1996)
 Stickman (independent release, 1995)

With Gilbert Engle
 Supernatural Absence (New Jazz Media, 2003)
 Jazz Fusion 1 thru 5 (New Jazz, 2015)
 Jazz Fusion 1 thru 3 (New Jazz, 2015)
 Jazz Reggae Fusion (New Jazz, 2016)
 Odd Time Signature Fusion (New Jazz, 2016)
 Petite Jazz Fusion (New Jazz, 2016)
 Magnum Opus Jazz Fusion (New Jazz, 2016)

With The Emptys
 Bridge Across the Ocean (Safari, 1994)
 Pick Your Ears Up (Safari, 1995)
 Loveversesnothing (Safari, 2002)

As sideman or guest
With Larry Brown
 Hard Bop Cafe (Lush Life, 2006)
 The Long Goodbye (Lush Life, 2002)

With Greg Hatza
To a New Place (I Ching, 2001)

With Vaughn Nark
 Panorama (Summit, 2004)
 Somethin' Special (Summit, 2000)

With Giancarlo Schiaffini
 Deconstruction! (Pentaflowers (Italy), 2000)
 Post – Deconstruction (Cadence Jazz, 2002)

With Mark Stanley
 Live at Blues Alley (Sir Eel, 2006)
 Humans (Sir Eel, 2003)

With others
 The Fisher Prince (Billion Dollar Films, 2006)
 King James and the Serfs of Swing, Introducing... (Josephsson, 2004)
 Jose Bowen, A Jazz Shabbat Service (Cross Over Music, 2003)
 Origem, Ijexa (Union, 1999)
 Radio Mosaic, Look Around (Little Guy, 1999)
 Ritmo Junction, Suburban Descarga (CSR, 1998)
 Dan Reynolds, To Be Sure (Never Alone Music, 1998)
 Sharón Clark, Finally (Union, 1997)
 River, Songs for the Harbinger (Grantham Dispatch, 1997)
 Red Letter Day, Four Bowls of Colour (Antwinnie Music, 1996)
 Music for Film and Television (Omnicast Music, 1996)
 June Rich, Rain (Hard Time, 1996)
 Primal Virtue (TOG Recordings, 1993)
 Fusion Hackers (Dungeon Music, 1992)

References

External links
Official web site

American jazz saxophonists
American male saxophonists
Living people
Royal Conservatory of The Hague alumni
21st-century American saxophonists
21st-century American male musicians
American male jazz musicians
Year of birth missing (living people)